Café is a 2010 independent drama film directed by Marc Erlbaum.  It stars Jennifer Love Hewitt, Daniel Eric Gold, Alexa Vega and Jamie Kennedy, who was Hewitt's boyfriend at the time of filming.

Plot
A good-hearted musician struggles to find a way to tell his beautiful barista coworker that he loves her, despite the fact that she is in a relationship. 

Meanwhile, regulars and customers at the café where they work have their own problems and encounters. A police officer keeps his eye on his wayward cousin, who owes money to a charismatic dealer, and a married man contemplates his relationship with a good-looking new acquaintance. 

However, one customer learns he is in fact the main character in the microcosm of the café, all designed by a young girl, who is actually God.

Cast
Jennifer Love Hewitt as Claire
Alexa Vega as Sally
Jamie Kennedy as Glenn
Michaela McManus as the Movie Woman
Madeline Carroll as Elly
Daniel Eric Gold as Todd
Cecelia Ann Birt as Earth Mother
Katie Lowes as Kelly
Hubbel Palmer as Avatar
Richard Short as the Writer
Khan Baykal as Colin
Derek Cecil as the Movie Man
Vaughn Goland as the Tattooed Goth Dude
Gavin Bellour as Dave
Clayton Prince as the Cop
Adam Shapiro as Smitty
Michael Satin as the Incredibly Tattooed Man
Daniel McCaughan, J.D. as the Dancing & Computer Patron

Filming
Filming started on May 11, 2009, in Philadelphia and ended in June 2009.

Release
The film premiered at the 19th Philadelphia Film Festival in October 2010.

In February 2011, Maya Releasing acquired the film rights for the US theatrical and home video release and foreign sales of Café.

Café opened on August 19, 2011, in Los Angeles, California.

Reception
The Los Angeles Times gave the film a mixed review, commending the acting from the leads but stating that the "story lines don't all effectively intertwine beyond their shared location."

Awards
The film won the "Crystal Heart Award" at the 2010 Heartland Film Festival, with producer Chris Wyatt attending to accept the trophy.

Music
 "New Song" by Birdie Busch
 "High Noon" by The Albertsons
 "Orphan" by La Strada
 "Butterfly" by Michelle Nágy
 "Flesh and Bone" by Andrew Lipske & the Prospects
 "Sorry Waltz" by Hezekiah Jones
 "This Town" by Emily Rodgers
 "Song For Tom" by The Innocence Mission
 "Mama" by La Strada
 "Firefly" by Mama Mac
 "Sweet Changin' Heart" by Andrew Lipske & the Prospects
 "Farewell" by Chris Kasper
 "When They Fight, They Fight" by The Generationals
 "Paperback Man" by Drew Pearson
 "Heron Blue" by Sun Kil Moon
 "Sing To Me" by Stephen Bluhm
 "Her Rotating Head" by Bachelorette
 "Gone Away From Me" by Ray LaMontagne
 "The Gun" by The Daily Parade
 "Tumbling" by Maus Haus
 "Alone" by Palomar
 "The Air Between Us" by Palomar
 "Slightly Under Water" by Red Heart the Ticker
 "Telegram" by Buried Beds
 "Bury Me Closer" by Palomar
 "Poison" by Emily Ana Zeitlyn and the Weeds
 "Fully" by Teddy Goldstein
 "There'll Be Pizza in the Valley" by Little Ocean
 "Broken" by Chauncey Jacks 
 "Clover" by Ramona Falls
 "Salt Sack" by Ramona Falls
 "Home" by Marla
 "Not The Real Thing" by Teddy Goldstein
Additional Music by Christopher Brady

References

External links
 
 

2010 films
American drama films
2010 drama films
Films shot in Philadelphia
2010s English-language films
2010s American films